Merry Hill is a 76 hectare partly wooded area in Hertfordshire, England, managed by the Woodland Trust. To the north is Oxhey and Bushey, to the west is South Oxhey and Carpenders Park, to the south is Hatch End and Harrow Weald, and to the north-west is Bushey Heath.

The Woodland Trust acquired part of the site in 1996, and carried out tree-planting; part of the new woodland has been given the name Little Hartsbourne Wood. In 1998 the Trust took a lease on another area which has been planted with fruit trees.

Merry Hill is also the name of a southwestern area of Bushey town.

References

Forests and woodlands of Hertfordshire
Populated places in Hertfordshire